The 2018–19 FA Youth Cup was the 67th edition of the FA Youth Cup. The defending champions were Chelsea who were going for their sixth win in a row. 
Liverpool won the final 5-3 after a penalty shoot-out against Manchester City, it was their fourth win in the competition.

Preliminary Round

First Round Qualifying

Second Round Qualifying

Third Round Qualifying

First Round

Second Round 

 

|note = Sutton United was kicked out for using ineligible Player so Clevedon Town moved on instead

Third Round

Fourth Round

Fifth Round

Quarter finals

Semi finals

Final

 
  
 
 
 
 
 
 
 
|-
|colspan=4|Substitutes:
|-
 
 
 
 
 

 
 

 

 
 

 
|-
|colspan=4|Substitutes:
|-

See also
 2018–19 FA Cup

References

External links
 The FA Youth Cup at The Football Association official website

FA Youth Cup seasons
Fa Cup
England